Plantago aucklandica is a flowering plant in the family Plantaginaceae that is endemic to the Auckland Islands.

Description
Plantago aucklandica differs from all other species of Plantago that are indigenous to New Zealand by its large leaves with up to seven veins, axillary hairs, wide petioles, and long spikes with up to 132 flowers. It has only two ovules (one of which aborts) in each ovary, and its seeds have low rounded protuberances on the ventral surface, whereas all other New Zealand native species have seeds with a networked ventral surface.

Habitat
It is found only at the higher elevations of the Auckland Islands where it grows in marshy places, on bare wind-blown areas and in rocky places.

Taxonomy & naming
It was first described by Joseph Dalton Hooker in 1844, from specimens he had collected in the Auckland Islands "on the mountain ridges at an altitude of 1000-1200 feet, in a peaty soil" while serving on the Ross expedition in the Antarctic  The specific epithet, aucklandica, is used to mean "of the Auckland Islands".

Conservation status
In 2009 and 2012, it was classified as "At Risk - Naturally Uncommon" under the New Zealand Threat Classification System, and again in 2018, it was given the same classification, because it is an island endemic with a restricted range.

References

aucklandica
Flora of the Auckland Islands
Taxa named by Joseph Dalton Hooker
Plants described in 1844